Lea Schüller (born 12 November 1997) is a German footballer who plays as a forward for Bayern Munich and the German national team.

Club career
Schüller started playing football at Hülser SV before joining the youth department of SGS Essen in 2012. She made her Frauen-Bundesliga debut aged 16 on 1 December 2013, in a 2–0 home defeat against VfL Wolfsburg. She scored her first two Bundesliga goals on 26 February 2014, in a 3–1 away win against BV Cloppenburg. In July 2017, Schüller extended her contract with SGS Essen for two years until June 2020.

In July 2020, Schüller signed a three-year contract with FC Bayern Munich. She made her debut for her new team in a preseason match, scoring the first two goals for a 3–1 win against SC Freiburg on 9 August. At the next preseason friendly, against UWCL qualifiers SK Slavia Prague, Schüller contributed a goal in a 4–0 win.

Schüller also made her first ever UEFA Women's Champions League appearance in a 2–1 loss against defending champions Olympique Lyonnais on 23 August. Bayern was subsequently knocked out on a 2–2 aggregate loss with Olympique Lyonnais moving to the semi-finals with an away-goal advantage.

FC Bayern began the 2020–21 Frauen-Bundesliga against SC Sand on 4 September, with Schüller in the starting XI and scoring her first Bundesliga goal with the team, ending with a 6–0 victory. Bayern would go on to win their third league title. Schüller scored a total of 16 goals in her first season with Bayern Munich, finishing third place behind Nicole Billa of TSG 1899 Hoffenheim (23 goals) and Laura Freigang of Eintracht Frankfurt (17 goals) as top scorers of the season.

She continued her impressive displays in the 2021–22 Frauen-Bundesliga season, finishing as the league's top goalscorer with 16 goals as well as the club's top goalscorer with 20 goals in all competitions.

International career
Schüller appeared for Germany under-17 national team at the 2014 U-17 Women's World Cup in Costa Rica, playing in all three group matches. With the under-19 team, she participated in the UEFA Women's Under-19 Championship in Israel, again playing in all three group matches and the defeat on penalties to Sweden in the semi-finals. She was then a member of the German under-20 squad at the U-20 Women's World Cup in Papua New Guinea in 2016, where they lost to France in the quarter-finals.

Schüller was first called up by coach Steffi Jones to train with the full German national squad in June 2017, but didn't make the final squad for the 2017 UEFA Women's Championship. She made her full international debut against Iceland in a 2019 World Cup qualifying match on 20 October 2017, coming on as a late substitute and scoring the final goal in a 3–2 defeat for Germany. Later in qualifying in April 2018, Schüller scored all 4 goals against the Czech Republic in a 4–0 win.

Career statistics

Scores and results list Germany's goal tally first, score column indicates score after each Schüller goal.

Honours
Bayern Munich
 Bundesliga: 2020–21
Germany

 UEFA Women's Championship runner-up: 2022

Individual
 Footballer of the Year (Germany): 2022

Private life 
Since 2019, Schüller is together with Austrian sport sailor Lara Vadlau.

References

External links

Living people
1997 births
German women's footballers
Germany women's international footballers
Women's association football forwards
People from Viersen (district)
Sportspeople from Düsseldorf (region)
SGS Essen players
Frauen-Bundesliga players
Footballers from North Rhine-Westphalia
2019 FIFA Women's World Cup players
FC Bayern Munich (women) players
UEFA Women's Euro 2022 players
German LGBT sportspeople
LGBT association football players
Lesbian sportswomen
21st-century German LGBT people